This list contains persons named in the Bible in the New Testament of minor notability, about whom either nothing or very little is known, aside from any family connections.

A

Abihud
Abihud or Abiud was the son of Zerubbabel according to the Gospel of Matthew (Matthew 1:15), although he was not mentioned in the Old Testament as the son of Zerubbabel. He could possibly be the same as Obadiah.

Achim

Addi
Addi or Addia was the son of Cosam, and the father of Melchi in the Genealogy of Jesus according to St. Luke.

Admin

Alexander

Amos
He was also the son of Nahum and the father of Mattathias.

Aristobulus
Aristobulus is apparently the patriarch of a household; Paul of Tarsus instructed his followers to greet "those who belong to the household of Aristobulus". Romans 16:10.

Azor

Azor is an ancestor of Jesus. According to Robert H. Gundry, Azor's name is a shorter name for Azariah.

C

Cainan
Cainan was the son of Arphaxad and the father of Shelah according to the Gospel of Luke. He is not mentioned in the Old Testament but some other Masoretic Texts supports this idea.

Chloe
Chloe was a member and ostensible head of a Christian household in Corinth and associate of Paul the Apostle. .

Chuza
Chuza was the manager of Herod Antipas' household. His wife, Joanna, was a follower of Jesus (see ).

Claudia

Cosam

E

Eleazar 

Eleazar was the son of Eliud, the father of Matthan, and an ancestor of Saint Joseph. He is mentioned in (Matthew 1:15); and is a descendant of Zerubbabel.

Eli
See Heli

Eliakim
Eliakim is the name of 2 different paternal ancestors of Saint Joseph:
The father of Jonam and the son of Melea.

The father of Azor.

Eliezer
He is also an ancestor of Jesus Christ.

Eliud

Eliud (meaning "God is my praise") was the great-great-grandfather of Saint Joseph.

Elmadam
Elmadam or Elmodam is the name of an ancestor of Saint Joseph, according to the genealogy found in the Gospel of Luke. He is the father of Cosam and the son of Er.

The Peshitta calls him Elmodad, but the Encyclopaedia Biblica suggests the reading "Elmatham," a form of the name Elnathan.

Er

Esli
Esli was an ancestor of Jesus according to the Gospel of Luke being the son of Naggai and the father of Nahum.

Eubulus

H

Heli

Heli was the son of Matthat and the father of St. Joseph only according to Luke; He was also the grandfather of Jesus Christ. In the Gospel of Matthew, Jacob was the father of St. Joseph instead of Heli and could possibly be the case of Levirate Marriage according to Sextus Julius Africanus.

Hermogenes 
A Hermogenes is briefly mentioned in 2 Timothy 1:15, where he, along with someone named Phygelus, are described as having "turned away" from Paul the Apostle. Nothing more is known about Hermogenes.

J

Jacob

Jacob was the son of Matthan and the father of St. Joseph in the Genealogy of Jesus according to St. Matthew. According to Sextus Julius Africanus, Heli and Jacob were step-brothers, and Heli died without having children, and his widow married his brother Jacob and bore him a child according to the law of Levirate Marriage his brother was legally the father of St. Joseph as well. The name "Jacob" appears two times in the Genealogy of Jesus. Here's a chart representing that Heli and Jacob are both the father of Joseph:

Jannai
Jannai was an ancestor of Jesus Christ according to the Gospel of Luke.

Jezebel
Jezebel was a false prophetess whom Jesus warned the church in Thyatira not to follow. She encouraged her followers to be promiscuous and to eat food sacrificed to idols. Jesus gave her a chance to repent of her sins, but she did not; thus, Jesus promised to punish her (see ).

Joanan
Joanan was the son of Rhesa and the father of Joda or Judah, according to the Gospel of Luke.

Jonah
Jonah also called John was the father of Saint Peter according to Matthew 16:17 and John 1:42 who called him John instead of Jonah. It is unclear whether Jonah was also the father of Saint Andrew the brother of Simon bar-jona.

Jonam

Jorim
Jorim was the son of Matthat and the father of Eliezer, according to the Gospel of Luke.

Josech
His name is sometimes translated as Joseph.

Joseph
There are 2 patriarchal ancestors of Jesus named Joseph, besides from his step-father St. Joseph.

He is also the great-great-great-great-grandfather of St. Joseph.

Joshua
Joshua, Jose or Jesus was the son of Eliezer which was the son of Jorim. Joshua's name is sometimes translated as Jesus. He is also the father of Er and an ancestor of Jesus Christ.

Judah
Judah was the name of 2 biblical individuals in the New Testament. His name is also called Joda or Juda.

The father of Simeon and the son of Joseph according to the passage .
The son of Joanan and the father of Josech. His name is also sometimes translated as Joda.

Judas of Straight Street in Damascus
When he went blind at his conversion experience, Paul the Apostle stayed at the home of a man named Judas who lived on Straight Street in Damascus. Then, Jesus told Ananias to go to Judas' house and restore Paul's sight (see ).

Julia

L

Levi
Levi (Hebrew לֵוִי) was the name of two minor figures mentioned in the Bible. For the more famous biblical character by this name, see Levi.
 The great-great-grandfather of Jesus; son of Melchi and father of Matthat.
 Another ancestor of Jesus.

M

Maath
Maath is a figure who appears in the Genealogy of Jesus according to St. Luke. He was the son of Mattathias.

Mattatha 
Mattatha is a figure who appears in the Genealogy of Jesus as the son of Nathan and the father of Menan, in the version found in the Gospel of Luke.

Mattathias
There are two minor biblical figures in the New Testament named Mattathias.

Matthan

Matthan (meaning "gift") was the grandfather of Saint Joseph.

Matthat
Possibly also translated as Matthan.
 The son of Levi, and father of Heli, great-grandfather to Jesus
 Son of another Levi, 31 generations before Jesus and 11 generations after King David

Melchi
(Meaning: "My king") there are two biblical figures named Melchi.

A son of Addi, and father of Neri.

Melea
The son of Menan (or Menna) and father of Eliakim, he is briefly mentioned as an ancestor of Jesus.

Menna

Mnason
A Christian of Jerusalem with whom Paul lodged. He was apparently a native of Cyprus, like Barnabas, and was well known to the Christians of Caesarea. He was an "old disciple" (R.V., "early disciple"), i.e., he had become a Christian in the beginning of the formation of the Church in Jerusalem.

N

Naggai 
Naggai (King James Version spelling Nagge) is the name of a figure found in the genealogy of Jesus according to the Gospel of Luke.

Nahum 
Nahum, in addition to being the name of the well-known biblical prophet Nahum, is also the name of a figure mentioned in passing in Luke's version of the genealogy of Jesus. The Nahum of Luke has his name spelled Naum in the King James Version.

Narcissus 
Narcissus is mentioned briefly in Romans 16:11, which sends greetings to "Those of the household of Narcissus who are in the Lord." Beyond this brief reference, nothing more is known for certain of the person referred to.

Naum 
See Nahum.

Nereus

Neri
Neri according to the Gospel of Luke was the father of Shealtiel instead of Jeconiah the
King of Judah. He was the son of Melchi .. Could possibly be the case of Levirate Marriage.

P

Phygelus
Nothing else is known about Phygelus.

R

Rhesa
Rhesa was the son of Zerubbabel according to the Gospel of Luke chapter 3, instead of Abiud, Luke added Rhesa as the son of Zerubbabel, he was also the father of Joanan.

S

Sadoc
See Zadok

Semein
Semein was the son of Josech also called Joseph.

Simeon

Simon Iscariot

T

Tryphosa

Tyrannus
Tyrannus was the operator of a school in Ephesus which the apostle Paul used as a base according to

Z

Zadok

See also 
 List of biblical names
 List of burial places of biblical figures
 List of major biblical figures
 List of minor biblical tribes

References 

 
Minor figures